Tikait may refer to

Given name
Tikait Umrao Singh, 19th century Indian ruler and freedom fighter

Surname
Mahendra Singh Tikait (1935–2011), Indian farmer leader 
Rakesh Tikait (born 1969), Indian farm union leader 

Other
Tikait Nagar, a town in Uttar Pradesh, India